"Sexy Can I" is the first single from Ray J's fourth studio album, All I Feel (2008). It was produced by Noel "Detail" Fisher and features rapper Yung Berg, whose debut album Look What You Made Me also includes the track. The song was released on January 8, 2008, and peaked at number three on the US Billboard Hot 100.

Chart performance
On the issue date of February 16, 2008, the single debuted on the Billboard Hot 100 at number 77 and climbed to peak at number 3 on the chart week of late 2007–2008 (after reaching the Top 40 on February 19, 2008), spending over three months in the Billboard Top 10. It is both Ray J's and Yung Berg's first top five single on the Billboard Hot 100. It has been certified Platinum by the Recording Industry Association of America (RIAA). The official remix which features Sheek Louch is on the soundtrack to Ray J's reality show For the Love of Ray J.

Music video
Professional basketball player Shaquille O'Neal makes a cameo in the music video. A second version of the video was shot of Yung Berg and Ray J performing the song, while a video model watches on a computer, in which The D.E.Y. appears.

Charts

Weekly charts

Year-end charts

Certifications

|-

Release history

References

2007 songs
2008 singles
MNRK Music Group singles
Epic Records singles
Hitmaka songs
Ray J songs
Song recordings produced by Detail (record producer)
Songs written by Detail (record producer)
Songs written by Hitmaka
Songs written by Ray J